BC Gargždai is a professional basketball club based in Gargždai, Lithuania. The club won the 2021–22 National Basketball League championship, which saw them promoted to the Lithuanian Basketball League for the 2022–23 season. They played their home matches at Palanga Arena.

Current roster

Depth chart

Junior team

BC Gargždai-2 participates in RKL B division (4th basketball division in Lithuania) since 2018.

References

External links
 Official website of BC Gargždai-SC
 BC Gargždai-SC NKLyga.lt

Basketball teams in Lithuania
Sport in Gargždai
Basketball teams established in 2014
2014 establishments in Lithuania